Lee Ji-eun (28 August 1971 – 8 March 2021) was a South Korean former actress and model, mainly active during the 1990s. She was known for playing Cho Hyun-ji in the KBS2 weekend soap opera A Sunny Place of the Young, as well as Emperor of the Sea. Born in 1971, she debuted into the showbusiness in 1994 when she modelled for a program called Good Morning on SBS. She received the 1995 Blue Dragon Film Award for Best New Actress for her performance in the film, My Dear Keum-hong.

Lee was found dead in her home in Seoul on 8 March 2021, aged 51.

Filmography

Film

Television series

Awards

References

1971 births
2021 deaths
20th-century South Korean actresses
21st-century South Korean actresses
South Korean film actresses
South Korean television actresses
People from Fukuoka
Place of death missing